Red Shoes and the Seven Dwarfs, known in Korean as simply Red Shoes (Redeu Syujeu) is a 2019 South Korean computer-animated fantasy film produced by Locus Corporation. It is based on the German language fairy tale "Snow White" by the Brothers Grimm, and its name is derived from the Danish fairy tale The Red Shoes by Hans Christian Andersen. The English dub of the film features the voices of Chloë Grace Moretz, Sam Claflin, Gina Gershon, Patrick Warburton, and Jim Rash.

Plot
On Fairy Tale Island, a group of heroic princes called the Fearless Seven – Merlin, Arthur, Jack, Hans, and triplets Pino, Noki and Kio – save a Fairy Princess from a dragon. However, after seeing her green face, they assume she is a witch and attack her. To teach them a lesson, she curses them to transform into green dwarfs whenever people look at them. The curse can only be broken by a kiss from "the most beautiful woman in the world", which they believe is impossible.

Seven years later, Princess Snow White, the overweight but strong and kind daughter of King White, sets out to find her missing father. She returns to her parents' castle, where her stepmother, Queen Regina, has taken over. She finds a message from her father telling her to find the seven and not to trust apples. She finds a pair of red shoes growing on a tree, which grant eternal life and beauty. Snow wears the shoes and transforms into a slim version of herself. Regina suddenly attacks, unaware that the slender woman is Snow. Snow escapes on a broomstick and crashes at the dwarfs' house. They prepare to attack, thinking she is the Fairy Princess, but welcome her into their home upon learning otherwise. Snow is shocked to see herself in the mirror and renames herself "Red Shoes". The seven are smitten and strive to impress her so she might kiss them.

Regina hires the selfish Prince Average of a neighboring kingdom. Average's soldiers chase Red Shoes to try and kidnap her, but Merlin saves her. That night, Red Shoes and Merlin grow closer to each other. During this time, Merlin tells her he can't wait for her to see the real him. He asks Red Shoes to close her eyes and imagine the real him. She does, but tells him that whether her eyes are open or closed, to her, he is still Merlin. He writes off her honest opinions about him as a joke. Regina gives Average and his bodyguards apples and turns them into monstrous wooden bears. In a secluded forest, Red Shoes tries to give Merlin a hint about her real self, but instead confesses her feelings for him, and they kiss. Merlin is shocked to see that the kiss did not undo his curse, as he still thinks Red Shoes is the prophetic woman. Merlin fights off an attack by Average and his bodyguards, but as Average falls into a river, he takes Merlin with him. Red Shoes saves Merlin by removing the shoes and regaining her strength, exposing herself as Snow White. She pointedly asks Merlin if he would have helped her real self, and Merlin leaves, ashamed. She then puts the shoes back on, thinking Merlin still likes her for her looks more than herself. Merlin imagines a conversation with his dwarf self and, realizing that Snow White likes him for who he is on the inside, decides to help her. In the forest, Regina disguises herself as Merlin and asks Red Shoes to eat an apple to help remove her shoes, but the real Merlin arrives, and the exposed witch abducts her stepdaughter.

In her castle, Regina again tries to force Snow White to eat an apple by threatening to kill a captured Merlin. Snow eats the apple and transforms into a new apple tree. Merlin fails to escape from Regina's magic mirror until the other dwarfs save him. Merlin sacrifices himself by falling down the castle with Regina to save Snow. With Regina dead, the wooden animals they befriended change back into humans, including King White. Pino, Noki, and Kio save Merlin and take him to Snow. He tells her she is the most beautiful woman whether his eyes are open or closed. After he dies in her arms, she revives him with a kiss, transforming him back into a prince. Merlin and Snow White happily accept each other's appearances, while Arthur remains confused by Snow's true identity.

During the end credits, Snow and Merlin marry, while the other princes find their own unusual-looking girlfriends. The Fairy Princess fishes Prince Average out of a river and turns him into another green dwarf after he regards her rudely.

Cast
 Chloë Grace Moretz as Princess Snow White/Red Shoes; a rewritten version of the classic fairy tale character, who is more overweight than the original character by the Brothers Grimm. Kind and selfless, she compensates for her plump figure by being a strong fighter. Her alias, "Red Shoes" is based on a Hans Christian Andersen story of the same name.
 Sam Claflin as Merlin; a heroic, athletic, but somewhat conceited prince and the leader of the Fearless Seven, who fights using magical lightning and initially believes looks are what make a woman desirable.
 Gina Gershon as Queen Regina; Snow White's stepmother and an evil witch seeking to steal back Snow White's shoes to achieve immortality and eternal youth.
 Patrick Warburton as the Magic Mirror; a snarky, talking mirror based on the Evil Queen's mirror of the original story. He is part of a magical tree and controls its branches.
 Jim Rash as Prince Average; a selfish, weak-willed prince who tries to force Snow White to be his birthday date.
 Simon Kassianides as Arthur; Merlin's closest friend, his rival for Snow White's affection, and the second-in-command of the Fearless Seven, who fights with swords.
 Frederik Hamel as Jack; an arrogant, French-accented prince in the Fearless Seven, who fights using an invisibility cloak and believes women are most interested in diamonds.
 Nolan North as Hans, the Twin Guards, and King White.
 Hans is a pastry chef and one of the Fearless Seven, whose main weapon is a shield that doubles as a frying pan and believes women can be won over with confectionery.
 The Twin Guards are two muscular but dim bodyguards of Prince Average.
 King White is Snow White's slightly overweight but loving father and Regina's husband.
 Frank Todaro as Pino, Noki, and Kio; inventive, identical triplets in the Fearless Seven who fight using a giant wooden robot of their creation.
 Brian T. Delaney as Big Bunny and Sculptor.
 Piotr Michael and Benjamin Diskin as two armored knights sent by Regina to find Snow White.
 Ava Kolker, Asher Blinkoff, and Juju Journey Brener as the Wooden Bear Cubs.

Additional voices by Brian T. Delaney, Benjamin Diskin, Terri Douglas, Piotr Michael, Amanda Troop, and Kari Wahlgren.

Reception

Critical reception 
Reception of the film has mixed. On Rotten Tomatoes, the film has a score of 40% from 5 reviews.

Fat shaming controversy 
A marketing campaign for the film revealed at the 2017 Cannes Marche du Film was criticized by critics and audiences for alleged fat shaming. Chloë Grace Moretz, who portrayed Snow/Red Shoes, stated she was "appalled" by the marketing that she felt it did not reflect the actual film's message. The production company immediately terminated the campaign and issued an apology, stating:As the producer of the theatrical animated film "Red Shoes and the 7 Dwarfs," now in production, Locus Corporation wishes to apologize regarding the first elements of our marketing campaign (in the form of a Cannes billboard and a trailer) which we realize has had the opposite effect from that which was intended. That advertising campaign is being terminated. Our film, a family comedy, carries a message designed to challenge social prejudices related to standards of physical beauty in society by emphasizing the importance of inner beauty. We appreciate and are grateful for the constructive criticism of those who brought this to our attention. We sincerely regret any embarrassment or dissatisfaction this mistaken advertising has caused to any of the individual artists or companies involved with the production of future distribution of the film, none of whom had any involvement with creating or approving the now discontinued advertising campaign.Later sources, including organizations aimed at promoting good messaging in family entertainment, would be more sympathetic to the film, noting that Red Shoes and the Seven Dwarfs is "loaded with valuable lessons for children and adults" and "promotes body image and self-acceptance, while confronting stereotypes."

See also 
South Korean animation

References

External links
 

2019 films
2019 animated films
Animated feature films
2019 independent films
2019 fantasy films
Films based on Snow White
Film controversies
Films scored by Geoff Zanelli
Films set in South Korea
Films about witchcraft
South Korean animated fantasy films
South Korean independent films
2010s English-language films
2010s South Korean films